Ngwa High School is a secondary school for boys in Aba. It located in Abayi, a town in Osisioma Ngwa.

History 

The school was established in 1954 with 29 boys. The school was supposed to be in Umuocham but was relocated to Abayi due to the school land been taken off from the school authority. The school was run through donations from individuals in Ngwa Land.  The first principal was Rev W. G. Pollard, a  British who served from 1954 to 1960. Afterwards, an African principal S. I. Amadi from Okirika in Rivers State served from 1961 to 1967.
After the  Nigeria Civil War the school was taken over by the Government of Nigeria but was returned to the Church of Nigeria in 2013.

Notable alumni 

 Chukwuemeka Ngozichineke Wogu
 Alex Otti
 Uche Ikonne

References

External links 

Secondary schools in Abia State
Boys' schools in Nigeria